Juventus Television, also known as Juventus TV or with the acronym JTV, is a subscription-based TV channel, entirely dedicated to the Italian professional football club Juventus F.C. The channel offers Juventus fans exclusive interviews with players and staff, full matches, including all Lega Calcio Serie A, Italian Cup and games in the UEFA Competitions (though not broadcast live), vintage matches, footballing news and other themed programming.
This sport channel is operating on “Media and Sponsor Center”, a sector of the Juventus’ training ground, since 1 November 2006.

Juventus Television was founded in 2006 under the name of Juventus Channel; in 2013 the name was changed in Juventus Television.

References

External links
 Juventus Channel (official website) 

Juventus F.C.
Television channels and stations established in 2006
Sports television in Italy
Television channels in Italy
Italian-language television stations
2006 establishments in Italy
Mass media in Turin
Football club television channels